Broadstone  is a suburb of Poole in Dorset, England. The ward had a population of 10,303 at the 2011 Census, increasing from 10,256 at the 2001 Census.

Since 1840, Broadstone has grown from a small farm to a suburb of 10,000 people. Centred on the main road (the B3074), 'The Broadway' is a busy hub of shops, churches, schools and housing. The shops consist of Costa Coffee, Bennett's Bakery, charity shops, a Tesco Express store, a Marks & Spencer supermarket and a jewellery shop. Broadstone is notable for its large recreation fields and heathland park, as well as an annual Christmas parade and lights. The  Broadstone Heath possesses some of the original heathland which covered the Poole Basin.

History
In 1840, "Broadstone Farm" was built, and a railway line bypassed it in 1847. Its first church was built in 1853, which later became the Scout hall. The first railway station was built in 1872 and named "New Poole Junction" and, after several name revisions, became "Broadstone" in 1890. Broadstone First School originated as a Dame school, founded in 1871. At the turn of the century, lavender oil started being produced. This ceased in 1935 when the factory burnt down, but much lavender can still be found in the area. Rapid expansion of the town has since occurred, with the development of the Pine Springs housing estate and the opening of additional schools to cope with the increase in population.

Toponymy
Legend has it that a number of "broad stones" were laid across a local stream to enable people to cross over without wetting their feet. This stream flows in the valley between Clarendon Road and Springdale Road, and the stones were located close to the Brookdale Farm. The Stepping Stones pub (now renamed 'The Blackwater Stream' since its takeover by Wetherspoon) was named in honour of this, and displays a large stone outside its beer garden. Rumoured to be the original, it was stolen decades ago and has since been replaced by a replica. There are also two stones outside Broadstone United Reformed Church, supposedly also originals from the stream.

Notable residents

The Victorian biologist, naturalist and philosopher Alfred Russel Wallace, who independently proposed the same evolutionary theory as Charles Darwin, lived in Broadstone during the last few years of his life. He built his own house, named Old Orchard, near what is now Wallace Road. His remains are buried in Broadstone Cemetery, next to those of his wife, Annie. His grave was restored by the A. R. Wallace Memorial Fund in 2000.

Annette Brooke, a Liberal Democrat MP for Mid-Dorset and North Poole from 2001 to 2015, currently resides in Broadstone.

Bryan Telfer, a commodore in the Royal Navy and veteran of the Falklands War is buried in Broadstone Cemetery.

Victor Watkins who lived in Broadstone was the first Scout in England to gain the Kings Scout Award (now the Queens Scout Award) and a Blue Plaque has now been unveiled on the wall outside the 29029 Nepalese Restaurant on Lower Blandford Road.

Martin Smith, five-time British Powerlifting champion, European and Commonwealth powerlifting medallist also resides in Broadstone.

Stuart Hibberd, the chief announcer of the BBC (or "voice of the BBC") for 25 years who announced the deaths of King George V and Adolf Hitler, died in Broadstone in 1983.

Education
Broadstone follows the Three-tier education model and contains two First schools (Broadstone First and Springdale First) and a middle school (Broadstone Middle School). Corfe Hills School is also located in Broadstone and is one of the largest secondary schools in Dorset. Corfe Hills School moved from being a Foundation School to being an Academy on 1 April 2011. Its catchment area serves Broadstone, Poole, Corfe Mullen, Wimborne, Merley as well as other areas.

Politics 
Broadstone is part of the Broadstone ward which elects two councillors to Bournemouth, Christchurch and Poole Council, and also the Mid Dorset and North Poole parliamentary constituency.

Clubs and associations
Broadstone is the centre of many clubs, societies and organisations for the South East Dorset area including The Lytchett archery club, Broadstone Football Club, the Broadstone Golf Club, Broadstone Horticultural society, Broadstone Tennis Society, Dorset Caledonian Society, Broadstone Scout Group, Broadstone Youth Centre and the Broadstone Cricket Club. Other local offices include the British Legion, the Rotary club, and the Broadstone Wessex Bowling Club.

References

External links

 Broadstone Village - Broadstone Businesses, offers and community events
 Broadstone Net - local community website

Areas of Poole